The Bangladesh Armed Forces are the combined military forces of the People's Republic of Bangladesh. It consists of the three uniformed military services: the Bangladesh Army, the Bangladesh Navy and the Bangladesh Air Force. The Armed Forces are under the jurisdiction of Ministry of Defence of the Government of Bangladesh, and is directly administered by the Armed Forces Division of the Prime Minister's Office. The President of Bangladesh serves as the Commander-in-Chief of the Bangladesh Armed Forces. It has the third-largest defence budget in South Asia and according to the Global Firepower index it is the third most powerful military force in South Asia. Border Guard Bangladesh and Bangladesh Coast Guard are under the jurisdiction of the Ministry of Home Affairs during peacetime, but during wartime they fall under the command of Bangladesh Army and Bangladesh Navy respectively.

Military policy is formulated and executed by the Armed Forces Division (AFD) whereas the Ministry of Defence (MoD) does not exercise any operational or policy authority over the Armed Forces. Since independence, the AFD and MoD has been led by the Prime Minister. To coordinate military policy with foreign and intelligence policy, both the president and the prime minister are advised by a six-member advisory board which consists of the three military services' Chiefs of Staff, the Principal Staff Officer of the Armed Forces Division, and military secretaries to the president and the prime minister. The directors general of the NSI, the DGFI and the BGB also serve in an advisory capacity, when invited.

Armed Forces Day is observed on 21 November and commemorates the founding of the three services of the Armed Forces who subsequently initiated a joint operation against the occupying Pakistan Army during the Bangladesh Liberation War. Official functions are held across the country including at Bangabhaban, the Armed Forces Division Headquarters at Dhaka Cantonment, all military cantonments and at every military installation throughout the country.

History

Eastern wing of Pakistan

With the partitioning of India on August 15th 1947, the territory constituting modern Bangladesh was partitioned from the province of Bengal as East Bengal, joining the newly created state of Pakistan. Ethnic and sectional discrimination prevailed in all sectors of the state. Like other government sectors, Bengalis were under-represented in the Pakistan military too. Officers of Bengali origin in the different wings of the armed forces made up just 5% of overall force by 1965. West Pakistanis believed that Bengalis were not "martially inclined" unlike Pashtuns and Punjabis; the "Martial Races" notion was dismissed as ridiculous and humiliating by Bengalis. Moreover, despite huge defence spending, East Pakistan received none of the benefits, such as contracts, purchasing and military support jobs. The Indo-Pakistani War of 1965 over Kashmir also highlighted the sense of military insecurity among Bengalis as only an under-strength infantry division and 15 combat aircraft without tank support were in East Pakistan to thwart any Indian retaliations during the conflict.

The East Bengal Regiment was formed on 15 February 1948 following Pakistan's independence and transition from post British rule, composed exclusively of men from the western part of the country. The first East Bengal Regiment was composed of Bengali members of the British Indian Army Pioneer Corps and Bihar Regiment of the abolished British-Indian army. Between 1948 and 1965, a total of eight battalions of EBR were raised.

Bangladesh Liberation War

Following the victory of the Awami League in the 1970 elections, then-president General Yahya Khan refused to appoint its leader Sheikh Mujibur Rahman as the prime minister and launched a brutal attack named Operation Searchlight on the civilians of the then East Pakistan, using the Pakistani army to repress political movements. The number of people killed by Pakistani forces vary from a minimum of around 300,000 to a maximum of around 3 million. Responding to Mujib's call for rebellion, many students, workers and other civilians mutinied against Pakistan and raised the Mukti Bahini, a guerrilla force. Later on, many Bengali officers and units from Pakistan Army and East Pakistan Rifles mutinied against their West Pakistani counterparts and joined the Mukti bahini. On 17 April 1971, Muhammad Ataul Gani Osmani took oath as the commander-in-chief of Mukti bahini. While the war raged on, the necessity of a well-trained armed force was always felt. During the first Bangladesh Sector Commanders Conference, held from 11 to 17 July 1971, the Bangladesh Forces started its journey composed of the revolting Bengali members of the Pakistan Army and EPR. In this historic conference the field command structure, sector reorganization, reinforcement, appointment of field commanders and tactics of warfare were decided upon and carried out. On 21 November 1971, the Bangladesh Forces was divided into three separate services as Bangladesh Army, Bangladesh Navy and Bangladesh Air Force.

The Bangladesh Forces received modest assistance from the Indian Government soon after the start of the war. On 3 December 1971, India-Pakistan war broke out and Indian troops enter Bangladesh allied with the Bangladesh Armed Forces. On 16 December 1971 the Pakistani Military force in Bangladesh surrender to a joint force of Indian and Bangladesh forces.

Post-independence 

The newly formed Bangladeshi armed forces incorporated some of the units and guerrillas of the Mukti Bahini. Gen. Osmani, who had led the Mukti Bahini was appointed the General of the Bangladesh armed forces. For many years, there was active discrimination in favour of the inductees from the Mukti Bahini against those Bengali officers who had continued service in the Pakistani armed forces or had been detained in West Pakistan. A group of angered officers assassinated the president Sheikh Mujib on 15 August 1975 and established a regime with politician Khondaker Mostaq Ahmed as President of Bangladesh and new army chief Maj. Gen. Ziaur Rahman. The military itself was subject of divisions as Mujib's assassins were overthrown by the pro-Mujib Brig. Gen. Khaled Mosharraf on 3 November, who himself was soon overthrown by a socialist group of officers under Col. Abu Taher on 7 November who returned Ziaur Rahman to power—an event now called the Sipoy-Janata Biplob (Soldiers and People's Coup). Under the presidency of Ziaur Rahman, the military was reorganised to remove conflicts between rival factions and discontented cadre. However, Ziaur Rahman was himself overthrown in a 1981 coup attempt, and a year later, Lt. Gen. Hossain Mohammad Ershad took power from the elected government of president Abdus Sattar. The military remained the most important force in national politics under the regimes of Ziaur Rahman and later Hossain Mohammad Ershad until democracy was restored in 1991.

Modern period 

Having relied primarily on India and Soviet Union for military aid, Bangladesh has also developed military ties with the People's Republic of China and the United States. The Bangladesh Army has been actively involved in United Nations Peace Support Operations (UNPSO). During the first Gulf War in 1991, the Bangladesh Army sent a 2,193 member team to monitor peace in Saudi Arabia and Kuwait. The Bangladesh Army also participated in peace keeping activities in Namibia, Cambodia, Somalia, Uganda, Rwanda, Mozambique, former Yugoslavia, Liberia, Haiti, Tajikistan, Western Sahara, Sierra Leone, Kosovo, Georgia, East Timor, Congo, Côte d'Ivoire and Ethiopia. As of October 2008, Bangladesh remained the second largest contributor with 9,800 troops in the UN Peacekeeping forces.

Until a peace accord was signed in 1997, the Bangladeshi military engaged in counterinsurgency operations in the Chittagong Hill Tracts fighting the Shanti Bahini separatist group. In 2001, Bangladeshi military units engaged in clashes with the Indian Border Security Force (BSF) along the northern border. 

Several projects and schemes aiming to expand and modernize the Bangladeshi armed forces were launched by the government of former Prime Minister Begum Khaleda Zia.

Forces Goal 2030 was launched by the government of Prime Minister Sheikh Hasina to secure new equipment for the Bangladeshi military.

Bangladesh-Myanmar border
Standoffs have occasionally occurred at the Bangladesh-Myanmar border, including in 1991 and 2008. Most of the standoffs took place when Myanmar attempted to force Rohingyas into Bangladesh. In 2008, the two countries deployed warships after Myanmar attempted to explore a disputed Bay of Bengal seabed for oil and gas. The dispute was resolved at an international tribunal in 2012. Bangladesh and Myanmar have also conducted counter-insurgency operations on the border. 
2008 Bangladesh–Myanmar naval standoff
2015 Bangladesh-Arakan Army border clash

Medals and decorations

The following are the various gallantry, service and war medals of the Bangladesh Armed Forces.

Gallantry awards 
  Bir Sreshtho-(literally, "The Most Valiant Hero"), the highest gallantry award
  Bir Uttom- (literally, "Better among Braves"), the second highest gallantry award
  Bir Bikrom- (literally, "Valiant hero"), the third highest gallantry award
  Bir Protik- (literally, "Symbol of Bravery or Idol of Courage"), the fourth highest gallantry award

Service medals
  Order of Military Merit
  Jestha Padak I (10 years service)
  Jestha Padak II (20 years service)
  Jestha Padak III (30 years service)

Current deployments

Bangladesh has consistently made large contributions to United Nations peacekeeping operations. As of May 2007, Bangladesh had major deployments in Democratic Republic of Congo, Liberia, Lebanon, Sudan, Timor-Leste and Cote d'Ivoire. With 10,736 troops deployed, it ranks first in personnel contributions to UN peacekeeping. The government declined to participate in Iraq on a request from the United States. The deployment to Liberia began in October 2003 and has remained at a level of about 3200 who are participating in peacekeeping, charitable activities and infrastructure development.

Training
Officers are trained and educated for three years at the Bangladesh Military Academy, Bhatiary, Bangladesh Naval Academy at Patenga, both located in Chittagong and Bangladesh Air Force Academy located in Jessore. For advance training during their career, officers are sent to Bangladesh Defence Services Command and Staff College at Mirpur, while senior officers attend the National Defense University for Armed Forces War Course. Many attend the Military Institute of Science and Technology while serving. Officers of the Army Medical Corps are recruited after graduation from both military or civil medical colleges. They undergo basic military training at Bangladesh Military Academy followed by professional training in medical corps centre and Armed Forces Medical Institute. Recently cadets of Armed Forces Medical College also started joining the services directly.

Ranks 

Bangladesh military ranks, essentially corresponds to those used by the armed forces of the commonwealth nations.

The rank insignia for commissioned officers for the Armed forces respectively.

Organization

Regular forces
 Bangladesh Army (Bangladesh Sena Bahini)
 Bangladesh Navy (Bangladesh Nou-bahini)
 Bangladesh Air Force (Bangladesh Biman Bahini)

Para-military forces

 Border Guard Bangladesh (BGB)
 Bangladesh Coast Guard  (BCG)

Civil forces and reserves
 Bangladesh Ansar
 Village Defence Party (VDP)
 Bangladesh National Cadet Corps (BNCC)

Specialized forces
 President Guard Regiment (PGR) – Bangabhaban (President's Office)
 Special Security Force (SSF) – Prime Minister's Office
 Para-Commando Brigade (The Cheetahs) – Under Command AHQ, Dhaka, Bangladesh Army
 Special Warfare Diving And Salvage (SWADS) – Bangladesh Navy
 41 Squadron Airborne - Special Ground Combatants (SGC) – Bangladesh Air Force

Military districts 
 Savar Area Command
 Ghatail Area Command,Tangail
 Bogra Area Command
 Rangpur Area Command
 Comilla Area Command
 Chittagong Area Command
 Ramu Area Command
 Jessore Area Command
 Sylhet Area Command
 Barisal Area Command
 Army Training and Doctrine Command
 Army Logistics Area

Dhaka Cantonment

 HQ All Military Lands
 HQ Cantonment Boards
 HQ's of Bangladesh Army
 Armed Forces Division (AFD)
 46 Independent Infantry Brigade
 24 Independent Engineers Brigade
 18 Engineers Brigade
 6 Air Defence Brigade
 14 Army Signal Brigade
 HQ, President's Guard Regiment
 Inter Services Selection Board (ISSB)
 HQ's Armed Forces Medical and Nursing Corps (AFMNC)
 Central Officer's Record Office (CORO)
 HQ's Armed Forces Recruiting Centre (AFRC)
 HQ's Cantonment Public Schools
 HQ's Armed Forces Library
 Armed Forces Institute of Pathology (AFIP)
 National Armed Forces Cemetery

Educational and training institutes 
Army Institute of Business Administration (Army IBA), Savar Cantonment, Dhaka
 Bangladesh Military Academy (BMA), Bhatiary, Chittagong
 School of Infantry and Tactics (SI&T), Jalalabad Cantonment, Sylhet.
 Defence Services Command and Staff College (DSC&SC), Mirpur Cantonment, Dhaka.
 National Defence College (NDC), Mirpur Cantonment, Dhaka.
 Military Institute of Science and Technology (MIST), Mirpur Cantonment, Dhaka.
 Armoured Corps Centre & School (ACC&S), Majira Cantonment, Bogra.
 Engineer Centre and School of Military Engineering, Qadirabad Cantonment, Natore.
 Signal Training Centre and School, Jashore Cantonment, Jashore.
 Army Service Corp Centre & School, Jahanabad Cantonment, Khulna.
 Army Medical Corps Centre & School, Shaheed Salahuddin Cantonment, Ghatail, Tangail.
 Ordnance Corps Centre & School, Rajendrapur Cantonment, Gazipur
 Bangladesh Institute of Peace Support Operation Training (BIPSOT), Rajendrapur Cantonment, Gazipur.
 Electrical and Mechanical Engineering Centre and School, Saidpur Cantonment, Nilphamari.
 Corps of Military Police Centre and School, Savar Cantonment, Savar, Dhaka.
 Army School of Education and Administration, Shahid Salahuddin Cantonment, Ghatail, Tangail.
 Army School of Physical Training and Sports (ASPTS), Dhaka Cantonment, Dhaka.
 Army School of Music, Chittagong Cantonment, Chittagong.
Armed Forces Medical College (AFMC), Dhaka Cantonment, Dhaka.
 Army Medical College Chattogram   (AMCC) 
 Army Medical College Comilla (AMCCo)
 Army Medical College Bogra (AMCB)
 Army Medical College Jessore (AMCJ)
 Rangpur Army Medical College (RAMC)
Artillery Centre and School, Halishahar, Chittagong.
 School of Military Intelligence, Moynamoti Cantonment, Comilla.
 East Bengal Regimental Centre, Chittagong Cantonment, Chittagong.
 Bangladesh Infantry Regimental Centre, Rajshahi Cantonment, Rajshahi.
 Non Commissioned Officers Academy, Majira Cantonment, Bogra.
 Bangladesh University Of Professionals(BUP), Mirpur Cantonment, Dhaka.

Training institutes of Bangladesh Air Force 
 Bangabandhu Sheikh Mujibur Rahman Aviation and Aerospace University 
 Bangladesh Air Force Academy (BAFA), Jessore.
 Flying Instructors School (FIS), Bogra.
 Command and Staff Training Institute (CSTI), Dhaka.
 Flight Safety Institute (FSI), Dhaka.
 Officers' Training School (OTS), Jessore.
 Aero-Medical Institute (AMI), Dhaka.
 Fighter Controller Training Unit (FCTU), Dhaka.
 School of Physical Fitness (SOPF), Dhaka.
 Recruits Training School (RTS), Chittagong.
 Training Wing (TW), Chittagong.
 Mechanical Transport Driving School (MTDS), Shamsher Nagar.
Helicopter Simulator Institute BAF(HSI), Dhaka

Training Institutes of Bangladesh Navy 
 Bangladesh Naval Academy (BNA), Chittagong.
 BNS Shaheed Moazzem, Kaptai, Rangamati Hill District, Chittagong. (For Sailor's Advanced Training)
 BNS ISA KHAN, Chittagong (Home of 13 Different Training Schools)
 BNS TITUMIR, Khulna (Home of New Entry Training School (NETS) and School of Logistics and Management (SOLAM))
 School of Maritime Warfare & Tactics, Chittagong Port.

Army Cantonments 
Cantonments are where Bangladesh Army personnel work, train, and live.
 Alikadam Cantonment (Bandarban)
 Bandarban Cantonment (Bandarban)
 Bangladesh Military Academy (Chittagong District)
 Bogra Cantonment (Bogra)
 Chittagong Cantonment (Chittagong)
 Comilla Cantonment (Comilla)
 Dhaka Cantonment (Dhaka)
 Dighinala Cantonment (Khagrachari)
 Halishahar Cantonment (Chittagong)
 Jahanabad Cantonment (Khulna)
 Jahangirabad Cantonment (Bogra)
 Jalalabad Cantonment (Sylhet)
 Jamuna Cantonment (Bhuapur, Tangail)
 Jessore Cantonment (Jessore)
 Kaptai Cantonment (Kaptai)
 Khagrachari Cantonment (Khagrachari)
 Kholahati Cantonment (Parbatipur, Dinajpur)
 Mirpur Cantonment (Mirpur)
 Mymensingh Cantonment (Mymensingh)
 Padma Cantonment (Munshiganj and Shariatpur)
 Postogola Cantonment (Dhaka)
 Qadirabad Cantonment (Natore)
 Rajendrapur Cantonment (Gazipur)
 Rajshahi Cantonment (Rajshahi)
 Ramu Cantonment (Ramu, Cox's Bazar)
 Rangamati Cantonment (Rangamati)
 Rangpur Cantonment (Rangpur)
 Saidpur Cantonment (Saidpur, nilphamary)
 Savar Cantonment (Savar)
 Shahid Salahuddin Cantonment (Ghatail, Tangail)
 Sheikh Hasina cantonment (Patuakhali)

Air Force bases 
 BAF Base Bangabandhu (Dhaka)
 BAF Base Sheikh Hasina (Cox's Bazar)
 BAF Base Khademul Bashar (Dhaka)
 BAF Base Matiur Rahman (Jessore)
 BAF Base Paharkanchanpur (Tangail)
 BAF Base Zahurul Haq (Chittagong)

Navy bases 
 BNS Haji Mohshin (Dhaka)
BNS Sheikh Mujib (Dhaka)
 BNS Issa Khan (Chittagong)
 BNS Shaheed Moazzem (Rangamati)
 BNS Sheikh Hasina (Cox's Bazar)
 BNS Sher-e-Bangla (Patuakhali)
 BNS Titumir (Khulna)
 BNS Ulka (Chittagong)
 BNS Vatiary (Chittagong)
BNS Nirvik (Chittagong)
BNS Mongla (Bagerhat)

Future modernisation plans 

Bangladesh has made a long term modernisation plan for its Armed Forces named Forces Goal 2030. The plan includes the modernization and expansion of all equipment and infrastructures and providing enhanced training.

Gallery

See also 
 Government of Bangladesh
 Military coups in Bangladesh
 Forces Goal 2030

Notes

References

External links 

 Official Website of Bangladesh Army 
 Official Website of Bangladesh Air Force

Government agencies of Bangladesh
Military of Bangladesh